Thomas Lodge (c. 1558–1625) was an English dramatist.

Thomas Lodge may also refer to:

Thomas Lodge (publican) (1830–1906), Australian publican
Thomas Lodge (Lord Mayor of London) (died 1584)
Thomas Lodge (civil servant) (1882–1958), British civil servant
Thomas Lodge (priest), priest in Ireland
Thomas Arthur Lodge (1888–1967), British architect
Tom Lodge (1936–2012), English author and broadcaster

See also
Tommy Lodge (1921–2012), cricketer
Thomas Skeffington-Lodge (1905–1994), British politician